Sergio Casal and Emilio Sánchez were the defending champions. 

Jim Pugh and Blaine Willenborg won the title, defeating Casal and Sánchez 7–6, 4–6, 6–4 in the final.

Seeds

  Sergio Casal /  Emilio Sánchez (final)
  Mansour Bahrami /  Loïc Courteau (first round)
  Eric Jelen /  Jonas Svensson (quarterfinals)
  Darren Cahill /  Mark Kratzmann (first round)

Draw

Draw

External links
 Draw

1987 BMW Open